The 2021 Cambridgeshire County Council election took place on 6 May 2021 as part of the 2021 local elections in the United Kingdom. All 61 councillors were elected from 59 electoral divisions, which returned either one or two county councillors each by first-past-the-post voting for a four-year term of office. The election was held alongside a full election for Cambridge City Council, the Cambridgeshire Police and Crime Commissioner, Mayor of Cambridgeshire and Peterborough and one-third of Peterborough City Council.

Previous composition

2017 election

Composition of council seats before election

Changes between elections

In between the 2017 election and the 2021 election, the following council seats changed hands:

The campaign
The Hickford Inquiry (that had come to be known in the press as 'Farmgate') into the tenancy of a county council owned farm by sitting Conservative councillor Roger Hickford and the delay in releasing the report was widely discussed in social media and covered in the local press election campaign coverage. Allegations of bullying and insider trading were made against the Conservative deputy-leader. Following the suspension of another Conservative councillor Simon King by his local party, over expenses submitted to Fenland District Council and the prime minister's flat refurbishment, there was a risk of allegations of sleaze dominating the campaign. Both the seats in his Sawston & Shelford ward were lost to the Liberal Democrats in the election, largely contributing to the Conservatives' loss of control of the council.

Results summary

In the local government elections the Conservatives had a net gain of 13 councils in England, Cambridgeshire, however was of the few Conservative held councils that was lost.
Only the Labour Party and the Conservative Party contested all 69 seats on the council. The Liberal Democrats stood 61 candidates, not standing in three divisions in Fenland and five divisions in Huntingdon District. The Trade Unionist and Socialist Coalition stood two candidates in the Godmanchester & Huntingdon South and the Huntingdon North & Hartford divisions. The four UK Independence Party candidates failed to win any seats. 
The Conservatives lost their overall majority despite winning all 9 Fenland District seats, and the low turnout in the north of the county, Wisbech West not even reaching 25%.

Aftermath
On 7 May Conservative county councillor Josh Schumann told the Cambridge Independent: "It is an indication we are going to have to work with others to ensure that the council delivers a lot of what it has done over the last four years."
A week later the BBC reported that the leaders of the Liberal Democrats, Labour and Independent groups had signed an agreement for control of the council.

Election of group leaders

Steve Count (March North & Waldersey) was reelected leader of the Conservative Group with Joshua Schumann (Burwell) as the deputy leader, Lucy Nethsingha (Newnham) was reelected leader of the Liberal Democrat Group with Lorna Dupré (Sutton) as the deputy, and Elisa Meschini (King's Hedges) was reelected leader of the Labour Group with Richard Howitt (Petersfield) becoming deputy leader.

Election of leader of the council

Lucy Nethsingha, the leader of the Liberal Democrat group, was duly elected leader of the council and formed a coalition administration, with Labour leader Elisa Meschini as her deputy leader.

Results by district
All electoral divisions elected one councillor unless stated otherwise.

(* denotes sitting councillor)

Cambridge (12 seats) 

District summary

Labour proved the dominant force in Cambridge, gaining seats in Chesterton and Market divisions from the Liberal Democrats, as well regaining the Cherry Hinton seat previously held by a former Labour member, who did not stand for re-election.

Division results

East Cambridgeshire (8 seats) 

District summary

The Liberal Democrats won both Ely seats from the Tories, and held on to their Sutton seat. Elsewhere, East Cambs remained blue.

Division results

Fenland (9 seats) 

District summary

It was a clean sweep for the Tories in Fenland. Despite some very low turnouts and swings against some candidates they held every seat. Among those returning was Tory group leader Steve Count.

Division results

Huntingdonshire (17 seats)

District summary

The Tories gained a couple of seats in Huntingdonshire from the LibDems, strengthening their hold on the area, losing by just 11 votes in St Neots East and Gransden to Stephen Ferguson (Independent).

Division results

South Cambridgeshire (15 seats)

District summary

The Liberal Democrats in South Cambridgeshire, gained seats from Conservatives in five divisions. The closest battle was in Hardwick, where Michael Atkins (Lib Dems) beat Lina Nieto (Con) by just five votes.

Division results

One of the two  Sawston & Shelford seats was vacant as Roger Hickford had resigned, the other incumbent did not stand for re-election.

By-elections

St Neots The Eatons

See also
 2021 Cambridgeshire and Peterborough mayoral election
 2021 Cambridgeshire police and crime commissioner election

References

2021
2021 English local elections